Adamsville is an unincorporated community in Gallia County, in the U.S. state of Ohio.

History
Adamsville was platted in 1837.

References

Unincorporated communities in Gallia County, Ohio
Unincorporated communities in Ohio